Podreber is a small settlement east of the town of Polhov Gradec in the Municipality of Dobrova–Polhov Gradec in the Upper Carniola region of Slovenia. It lies on the road from Ljubljana to Polhov Gradec below Kucelj Hill (705 m).

Name
The name Podreber is derived from a prepositional phrase in which the noun has lost its case ending: pod 'below' + reber 'slope'. The name therefore means 'below the slope' and refers to the settlement's position on the south slope of Kucelj Hill.

Church

St. Elizabeth's Church in the village was first mentioned in 1526 but is considerably older. The main altar dates from the beginning of the 18th century, and the two side altars are gilded altars dating from 1625.

References

External links

Podreber on Geopedia

Populated places in the Municipality of Dobrova-Polhov Gradec